Israel Gohberg (23 August 1928 – 12 October 2009) was a Bessarabian-born Soviet and Israeli mathematician, most known for his work in operator theory and functional analysis, in particular linear operators and integral equations.

Biography 
Gohberg was born in Tarutyne to parents Tsudik and Haya Gohberg. His father owned a small typography shop and his mother was a midwife. The young Gohberg studied in a Hebrew school in Taurtyne and then a Romanian school in Orhei, where he was influenced by the tutelage of Modest Shumbarsky, a student of the renowned topologist Karol Borsuk.

He studied at the Kyrgyz Pedagogical Institute in Bishkek and the University of Chişinău, completed his doctorate at Leningrad University on a thesis advised by Mark Krein (1954), and attended the University of Moscow for his habilitation degree.

Gohberg joined the faculty at Teacher's college in Soroki, at the teachers college in Bălți before returning to Chişinău where he was elected into the Academy of Sciences and also being appointed head of functional analysis at University of Chişinău (1964–73). After moving to Israel, Israel joined Tel Aviv University (1974) and was at the Weizmann Institute at Rehovot.  Since then he also had positions at Vrije Universiteit in Amsterdam (1983), as well as at University of Calgary and University of Maryland, College Park.

He founded the Integral equations and operator theory journal (1983).

Gohberg was the visionary and driving force of the International Workshop on Operator Theory and its Applications, or IWOTA, starting with its first meeting on August 1, 1981. He became a lifetime president of the IWOTA Steering Committee and a founder of the Springer / Birkhäuser Verlag book series Operator Theory: Advances and Applications (OTAA).

Gohberg was awarded the Humboldt Prize in 1992. He received honorary doctorates from the Darmstadt University of Technology in 1997; from the Vienna University of Technology in 2001; from Universitatea de Vest din Timişoara in 2002; from Universitatea de Stat din Moldova, Chişinău, Moldova in 2002; from Universitatea de Stat "Alecu Russo" din Balti, Balti, Moldova in 2002; and from Technion, June 2008. He also was awarded the M.G. Krein Prize of the Ukrainian Academy of Sciences in 2008, and was elected SIAM Fellow in 2009.

He died in Ra'anana in 2009.

Publications 
Gohberg has authored near five hundred articles in his field. Books, a selection:
 1986. Invariant subspaces of matrices with applications. With Peter Lancaster, and Leiba Rodman. . Vol. 51. SIAM, 1986.
 2003. Basic classes of linear operators. With Rien Kaashoek and Seymour Goldberg.  Springer, 2003.
 2005. Convolution equations and projection methods for their solution. Izrail. With Aronovich Felʹdman. Vol. 41. AMS Bookstore.
 2009. Matrix polynomials.  With Peter Lancaster, and Leiba Rodman. Vol. 58. SIAM, 2009.

Articles, a selection:
 Gohberg, Israel C., and Mark Grigorʹevich Kreĭn. Introduction to the theory of linear nonselfadjoint operators in Hilbert space. Vol. 18. American Mathematical Soc., 1969.

References

External links 
 pictures of Gohberg
 Death Notice in Hebrew

1928 births
2009 deaths
People from Odesa Oblast
Moldovan Jews
Soviet Jews
Soviet emigrants to Israel
Israeli people of Moldovan-Jewish descent
Israeli mathematicians
Jewish scientists
Soviet mathematicians
Saint Petersburg State University alumni
Academic staff of Tel Aviv University
Academic staff of the University of Calgary
University of Maryland, College Park faculty
Members of the Royal Netherlands Academy of Arts and Sciences
Fellows of the Society for Industrial and Applied Mathematics